Stephen White (1 September 1928 – 6 September 2009) was an Irish Gaelic footballer who played as a left wing-back for the Louth senior team.

White made his debut on the inter-county scene at the age of seventeen when he first linked up with the Galway minor team before later joining the junior side. He joined the Louth senior team for the 1947 championship. White went on to win one All-Ireland medal and four Leinster medals. White was an All-Ireland runner-up on one occasion.
 
White was a member of the Leinster inter-provincial team on a number of occasions and won four Railway Cup medal. He retired from inter-county football following the conclusion of the 1963 championship.

References

1928 births
2009 deaths
Louth inter-county Gaelic footballers
Cooley Kickhams Gaelic footballers
Dundalk Young Irelands Gaelic footballers
Mountbellew Gaelic footballers